Sead Kapetanović (born 21 January 1972) is a Bosnian retired footballer.

Club career
Although he came from family known for supporting and even playing for FK Sarajevo (his brother was a professional footballer too), his career began in their biggest rivals, FK Željezničar. His first division debut came in 1990 and he even scored a goal. In 1992, War in Bosnia-Herzegovina escalated and he went to Germany. First, he was playing for some low division clubs, and in the 1994–95 season he moved to second division FSV Frankfurt. In 1995, he moved to VfL Wolfsburg and two years later won promotion to Bundesliga. He collected 104 league appearances for the club until he signed a contract with Borussia Dortmund in summer of 1999. Over the course of two seasons, he did not get much chance to play regularly and that is why he decided to come back to Bosnia and Herzegovina. In total, he made 57 appearances and scored two goals in the Bundesliga. After coming back to his homeland, he played a couple of games for FK Sarajevo, and then retired from professional football.

International career
He made his debut for Bosnia and Herzegovina in a November 1996 friendly match away against Italy and has earned a total of 14 caps, scoring no goals. His final international was a March 2000 friendly against Macedonia.

References

External links

National team stats – NFSBIH

1972 births
Living people
Footballers from Sarajevo
Association football midfielders
Yugoslav footballers
Bosnia and Herzegovina footballers
Bosnia and Herzegovina international footballers
FK Željezničar Sarajevo players
Viktoria Aschaffenburg players
SV Wehen Wiesbaden players
FK Sarajevo players
FSV Frankfurt players
VfL Wolfsburg players
Borussia Dortmund players
Yugoslav First League players
Oberliga (football) players
Bundesliga players
2. Bundesliga players
Premier League of Bosnia and Herzegovina players
Bosnia and Herzegovina expatriate footballers
Expatriate footballers in Germany
Bosnia and Herzegovina expatriate sportspeople in Germany